Digitcom Canada Inc. is a Canadian company that works on phone systems and data networks distributor. Primarily serving the greater Toronto, Montreal, and Southern Ontario small and midsize enterprise (SME) markets. Digitcom provides sales and support for telecommunications systems. Digitcom also runs blog, which provides news, insight and analysis of current events at telecommunications markets worldwide .

History
Established in 1991, Digitcom began as a reseller of voice mail, specializing in selling the Octel Compass product to the Canadian business market. The company expanded in 1993, which saw the inclusion of the sales and support of Avaya, Cisco, and the legacy Nortel line of telephony products.

Critical acclaim
Digitcom is an Avaya SME Expert dealer in Canada, and President Jeff Wiener is currently the only Canadian to sit on the Avaya SME Advisory Council.

On October 20, 2010, at Avaya’s Global Sales and Partner Conference in Las Vegas, Digitcom received the SME Canadian Business Partner of the Year award. To be considered for the Business Partner of the Year award, eligible companies must achieve a 90 percent customer satisfaction rating, demonstrate industry leadership and outperform key strategic goals.

References

External links
Official website
Company blog
Headsets(by Digitcom)

Telecommunications companies established in 1991
Telecommunications companies of Canada
1991 establishments in Canada
Canadian companies established in 1991
Companies based in Markham, Ontario